Haim Shabo is a former Israeli footballer and current manager.

He is of a Tunisian-Jewish descent.

Honours
Liga Artzit
2003–04
Toto Cup Artzit
2003–04

References

1973 births
Living people
Israeli footballers
Footballers from Ramat HaSharon
Hapoel Nir Ramat HaSharon F.C. players
Maccabi Petah Tikva F.C. players
Maccabi Herzliya F.C. players
Hapoel Herzliya F.C. players
Beitar Tel Aviv Bat Yam F.C. players
Maccabi HaShikma Ramat Hen F.C. players
Hapoel Hod HaSharon F.C. players
Israeli football managers
Hapoel Nir Ramat HaSharon F.C. managers
Maccabi Herzliya F.C. managers
Hapoel Petah Tikva F.C. managers
Hapoel Rishon LeZion F.C. managers
Israeli Premier League managers
Israeli people of Tunisian-Jewish descent
Liga Leumit players
Association football midfielders